Raymond Jean (21 November 1925, Marseille – 3 April 2012, Gargas in the Vaucluse department) was a prolific French writer. He published more than 40 books in many genres, and won the Prix Goncourt de la nouvelle in 1983 for his book Un fantasme de Bella B. His novella La lectrice was turned into a hit film by director Michel Deville, starring Miou-Miou. It has been translated in English by Adriana Hunter for publication by Peirene Press, under the title Reader for Hire.

Bibliography 

1953: Le Bois vert, Seghers
1959: Les Ruines de New York, Albin Michel
1961: La Conférence, Albin Michel
1963: Les Grilles, Albin Michel
1964: Nerval, Seuil
1965: La littérature et le réel : de Diderot au "Nouveau roman", Albin Michel
1966: Le Village, Albin Michel
1966: Eluard, Seuil
1968: La Vive, Seuil
1971: Pour Gabrielle, Seuil
1971: Les Deux Printemps, Seuil
1971: La Ligne 12, Seuil
1974: La Femme attentive, Seuil
1975: La Poétique du désir, Seuil
1976: La Fontaine obscure, Seuil
1976: Pratique de la littérature, Seuil
1978: La Rivière nue, Seuil
1979: La Singularité d'être communiste, Seuil
1980: Photo souvenir, Seuil
1982: L., Seuil
1982: Choses parlées, with Eugène Guillevic, Champ Vallon
1983: Un fantasme de Bella B., Actes Sud
1983: L'Or et la Soie, Seuil
1984: Les Lunettes, Éditions Gallimard
1984: Jean Tortel, Seghers
1985: Belle clarté, chère raison, Desclée de Brouwer
1986: Cézanne, la vie, l'espace, Seuil
1986: La Lectrice, Actes Sud, (adapted in film in 1987 under the title The Reader by Michel Deville, with Miou-Miou )
1988: Transports, Actes Sud
1989: La Dernière Nuit d'André Chénier, Albin Michel
1999: Les Perplexités du juge Douglas, Actes Sud
1999: Le Roi de l'ordure, Actes Sud
2000: Tutoiements, Arléa
2000: Un portrait de Sade, Actes Sud
2002: La Terre est bleue, Renaissance du livre
2002: Clotilde ou le second procès de Baudelaire, Actes Sud
2009: La leçon d'écriture, nouvelles, L'aube, 2009
2011: Légère et court vêtue ou Lubie en Luberon, Éditions du Luberon, his last work

References

External links 
 Raymond Jean, auteur de La lectrice, est mort on L'Express (10 April 2012)
 Disparition de Raymond Jean, écrivain et militant on L'Humanité (5 April 2012)
 [http://www.la-croix.com/Culture/Actualite/Deces-de-l-ecrivain-Raymond-Jean-auteur-de-La-Lectrice-_NG_-2012-04-10-789680 Décès de l’écrivain Raymond Jean, auteur de « La Lectrice »] on La Croix'' (10 April 2012)

French male novelists
20th-century French novelists
21st-century French novelists
20th-century French essayists
21st-century French essayists
Prix Goncourt de la nouvelle recipients
Academic staff of the University of Provence
Writers from Marseille
1925 births
2012 deaths
20th-century French male writers
21st-century French male writers
French male non-fiction writers